White City may refer to:

Places

Australia
 White City, Perth, an amusement park on the Perth foreshore
 White City railway station, a former railway station
 White City Stadium (Sydney), a tennis centre in Sydney
 White City FC, a football club based in Adelaide, South Australia

Azerbaijan
 Baku White City

Canada
 White City, Saskatchewan

France
 White City, a British front sector near Hawthorn Ridge Redoubt during the Battle of the Somme in 1916

Israel
 White City (Tel Aviv), a World Heritage Site

United Kingdom 
 White City, London
 White City Stadium
 White City Greyhounds
 White City tube station
 Westfield London, a shopping development formerly known as "White City"
 White City Place, a set of buildings including the BBC Media Village and BBC Television Centre
 White City, Gloucester
 White City, Greater Manchester, a retail park, formerly botanical gardens and stadium
 White City, Isle of Man
 White City, Scotland, a section of Ayr
 White City Stadium, Cardiff, a former greyhound stadium
 White City Stadium, Glasgow, a former greyhound and speedway stadium
 White City Stadium (Liverpool), a former greyhound stadium
 White City Stadium (Manchester) a former stadium on the White City site
 White City Stadium (Newcastle), a former greyhound stadium by Scotswood Bridge
 White City Stadium (Nottingham), a former greyhound and speedway stadium
 White City, Swansea Greyhound Track, a former independent greyhound track

United States

Cities and neighborhoods
 White City, Florida (disambiguation)
 White City, Illinois
 White City, Kansas
 White City, Kentucky
 White City, a neighborhood in Forest Hills, Boston, Massachusetts
 White City Historic District, a neighborhood in Tulsa, Oklahoma
 White City, Oregon
 White City, Utah
 White City, Wisconsin

Amusement parks
 White City (amusement parks)
 Lakeside Amusement Park or White City, Denver, Colorado
 White City (Chicago), a recreational park in Illinois, 1905–1946
 The White City, an "ideal city" constructed for the 1893 World's Columbian Exposition in Chicago, Illinois
 White City (Indianapolis), an amusement in Indiana, 1906–1908
 White City (New Orleans), an amusement park in Louisiana, 1907–1913
 White City (Shrewsbury, Massachusetts), an amusement park, 1905–1960
 White City (Philadelphia), an amusement park in Pennsylvania, 1898–1912
 White City (Bellingham), an amusement park in Washington, 1906–1919

Cities known as "The White City"
 Arequipa, Peru
 Baicheng, China 
 Belgorod, Russia
 Belgrade, Serbia
 Bely Gorod, the central core area of Moscow, Russia
 Biograd (disambiguation), multiple places
 Mérida, Yucatán, Mexico
 Nicosia (leuke ousia or white estate), Cyprus
 Ostuni, Italy
 Popayán, Colombia
 Sucre, Bolivia
 Spitak, Armenia

Music
 White City (band), a rock band based in Kabul, Afghanistan
 White City: A Novel, a 1985 album by Pete Townshend
 "White City", a song by the Pogues from Peace and Love
 "White City", a song by Thomas Dolby from The Flat Earth
 "(White City)", a song by Handsome Furs from Face Control

Other uses
 Minas Tirith or White City, fictional capital of Gondor in Middle-earth
 White City, a fictional venue in Pokémon Stadium 2
 La Ciudad Blanca (The White City), a legendary city in Honduras